The Uly-Zhylanshyk is a river in Kazakhstan.

It is one of the rivers of the Turgay Depression, flowing across the Amangeldi and Zhangeldi districts of the Kostanay Region, Kazakhstan. Its waters are used for irrigation.

Course 
The river is formed at the confluence of rivers Dulygaly-Zhylanshyk from the right and the Ulken-Zhylanshyk from the left. Both have their sources in the Ulutau range of the Kazakh Uplands. The Uly-Zhylanshyk flows roughly westwards all along its course, sometimes bending northwest for a certain distance and others to the southwest. As it reaches its last stretch the river meanders strongly. Finally it flows into the northeastern shore of lake Akkol, an endorheic salt lake located in Zhangeldi District, north of Shalkarteniz. The Uly-Zhylanshyk is fed mainly by snow.

See also
List of rivers of Kazakhstan

References

External links
Здесь невозможно утонуть. Соленое озеро Акколь привлекло внимание туристов

Rivers of Kazakhstan
Kostanay Region
Endorheic basins of Asia